Hilmi Ok (18 January 1932 – 15 February 2020) was a Turkish football referee.

Refereeing career
Ok was assigned to referee in the Süper Lig in 1974, before becoming a FIFA referee in 1976.

In 1980, Ok was assigned to referee at UEFA Euro 1980, where he officiated a group stage match between the Netherlands and Czechoslovakia.

Ok retired from officiating in 1981.

Personal life
Ok died on 15 February 2020 at the age of 88.

References

External links
 Profile at worldfootball.net

1932 births
2020 deaths
Sportspeople from Istanbul
Turkish football referees
UEFA Euro 1980 referees